Oh Holy Fools: The Music of Son, Ambulance & Bright Eyes is a split EP by Son, Ambulance and Bright Eyes, released in 2001 by Saddle Creek Records. All of the songs by Bright Eyes on the EP can also be found on their EP Don't Be Frightened of Turning the Page.

This album is the 34th release of Saddle Creek Records.

Track listing

Reception
In a review of the EP, Will Hermes of Spin wrote that Son, Amulance's Joe Knapp and Bright Eyes' Conor Oberst combine "their indiepop sensitivity with a passive-aggressiveness even rap-rockers might appreciate", adding: "Oberst shines brightest [...] But the two yin-yang nicely".

References

Son, Ambulance albums
2001 EPs
Split EPs
Bright Eyes (band) EPs
Saddle Creek Records EPs